Wendy Salgado (born 9 May 1983) won the Miss Universe Honduras 2007 contest. She represented Honduras at the Miss Universe 2007 pageant in Mexico City, Mexico on 28 May 2007, and represented her country at the Miss Continente Americano 2007 pageant in Guayaquil, Ecuador. on 30 June 2007.

She is studying for a degree in business administration in Ceutec.

Past awards she has won include Miss Bikini Tegucigalpa, Honduras and Miss Piel Dorada, Miss Summer Tegucigalpa, both in 2004. She was Miss Hawaiian Tropic Honduras in 2005.

References

External links
Photos of Wendy Salgado in Miss Universe 2007 and Miss Continente Americano 2007

1983 births
Miss Universe 2007 contestants
Living people
Honduran beauty pageant winners